Ryan Roberts may refer to:

Ryan Roberts (baseball), baseball player
Ryan Roberts (mixed martial artist) (born 1978), American mixed martial artist
Ryan Roberts (gymnast)  (born 1992), American trampoline gymnast
Ryan Roberts (American football) (born 1980), American gridiron football player

See also
Robert Ryan (disambiguation)
Ryan Robert Jarvis, English footballer